Pseudostola is a genus of leaf beetles in the subfamily Eumolpinae. It is endemic to Madagascar.

Species
Species include:
 Pseudostola amoena Bechyné, 1949
 Pseudostola fulvida Fairmaire, 1902
 Pseudostola grandis (Fairmaire, 1901)
 Pseudostola ornata Zoia, 2019
 Pseudostola perrieri Fairmaire, 1899
 Pseudostola tuberculicollis Bechyné, 1946

Synonyms:
 Pseudostola grandis Fairmaire, 1902: synonym of Pseudostola grandis (Fairmaire, 1901)

References

Eumolpinae
Chrysomelidae genera
Beetles of Africa
Insects of Madagascar
Taxa named by Léon Fairmaire
Endemic fauna of Madagascar